Amal Kenawy (1974–19 August 2012) was an Egyptian contemporary visual artist, best known for her videos, performance and feminist work. Active since 1998, her successful career helped her gain international recognition.

Biography 
Amal Kenawy was born in 1974 in Cairo, Egypt. She showed an interest in film, art and fashion design from an early age. In her childhood, Amal used to make her own clothes from any fabric she could find. Her parents struggled financially and Amal was the youngest of four children.

Her artistic studies began at the Egypt Cinema Institute. In 1999 she received her undergraduate degree in painting, from the Faculty of Fine Arts at Helwan University.

She started her artistic career as a student, collaborating with her older brother, Abdel Ghany Kenawy. Their collaboration resulted in a large number of artworks ranging from sculptures, compositions and videos. Their work gained several awards and international recognition, including UNESCO's Grand Prize at the International Cairo Biennale.

Amal married Shady Elnoshokaty, a contemporary artist who helped her at the beginning of her career. After they divorced Amal lived with her son, Yassin.

Her solo work drew upon a more intimate approach. She used her own body alongside representations of fragile materials, animals and objects, to express mental and physical pain and address themes such as birth, marriage, death, dreams and memory.

Amal Kenawy died on August 19, 2012, at the age of 38 after a long battle with leukemia. Her work is still exhibited in many museums and institutions around the world. She is remembered as one of the most inspirational feminist artists in the middle east. She was an iconic female artist, respected for her creativity and deep devotion to her work, though tragically short-lived.

Her work is collected by major public collection, such as Mathaf: Arab Museum of Modern Art in Qatar and the Sharjah Art Foundation in the UAE, and exhibited in major biennials such as Dakar Biennale and Sharjah Biennial.

Notable works 
 2002 Frozen Memory, video, photograph and sculpture composition
 2003 The Room, performance
 2004 The Journey, video performance and wax sculpture featuring Amal wearing a white dress and floating above the floor of the room in which she is confined, only to later drop heavily on her feet to resume twirling and floating again. 
 2006 You Will Be Killed, video animation and paintings
 2006 Booby Trapped Heaven, video and photography
 2007 Non Stop Conversation, video and performance
 2010 Silence of the Lambs AKA Silence of the Sheep, public performance

Awards 
 1998  UNESCO Grand Prize at the 7th Cairo International Biennial.
 1998  The AICA commission (Marseilles Art Studios), France.
 2003  Special mention at International Ismailia Festival for Documentary and Short Films, Egypt.
 2004  Grant of Pro-Helvetia Swiss Arts Council, Artists residency, Aarau /Switzerland.
 2004  The State National Prize for Art, Science, Literature, for using Video as Visual medium, Egypt.
 2004  Dakar Biennale award.
 2005  The 23rd Alexandria Biennial Golden Prize.
 2005  The global crossings prize, Leonardo/ISAST, the International Society for the Arts, Sciences and Technology, Los Angeles, USA.
 2006  Dakar Biennale award.
 2006  The 12th Cairo International Biennial grand prize.
 2010  The Sharjah International Biennial award.

References 

1974 births
2012 deaths
20th-century Egyptian women artists
21st-century Egyptian women artists
Egyptian contemporary artists
Helwan University alumni
Artists from Cairo